Independence Plaza is a highrise office building located in downtown Midland, Texas.  It is the city's fourth tallest building after the Bank of America Building, the Wilco Building and Centennial Tower.  Floors two thru seven are parking garage in the building and floors eight thru 16 are office.  The building also has a seven-level parking garage attached to it on its north side.  Independence Plaza was constructed during Midland's building boom when the city experienced rapid growth and a need for office space in the early 80's due to an oil boom.  Today, a local bank occupies the lobby of the building and various companies are tenants on floors eight thru sixteen.

See also 
 List of tallest buildings in Midland, Texas

References

Skyscraper office buildings in Midland, Texas

Office buildings completed in 1984